is a Japanese bank founded in Gifu, Gifu Prefecture as the 16th National Bank in 1877, which was reorganized to the ordinary commercial bank and renamed to Juroku Bank in 1896.

It has been strengthening comprehensive financial services while experiencing a series of bank mergers.

See also
Tom and Jerry#Outside the United States

References

External links
 Homepage of Juroku Bank, Annual Report 

Regional banks of Japan